Cossack Village and St. Nicolas Crush church is an open-air museum of Cossack culture in Ukraine. 

The museum was created for the National Historical and Cultural Preserve Chyhyryn. It is located in  Stetsivka, 240 kilometres southeast of Kyiv.

References

External links 
 NHCP "Chyhyryn" site (Ukrainian)
 Каднічанський Д. Скансени України // Краєзнавство. Географія. Туризм No. 16 (645), квітень 2010
 Museums in Stetsivka (Ukrainian)
 NHCP "Chyhyryn" guide

National Historical and Cultural Preserve "Chyhyryn"
Open-air museums in Ukraine